D27 is a state road connecting Gračac in the southern part of Lika, Croatia to D8 state road via Benkovac.
The road also provides an alternate route to the sections of A1 motorway and the D8 state road 
that cross the Maslenica strait over the two Maslenica bridges, underneath the Velebit. This is especially important when strong wind or storms (usually the bora) cause the A1 motorway section between Maslenica Bridge (A1) and Sveti Rok Tunnel to be closed for traffic for safety reasons.

The road, as well as all other state roads in Croatia, is managed and maintained by Hrvatske ceste, a state-owned company.

Traffic volume 

Traffic is regularly counted and reported by Hrvatske ceste, operator of the road. Substantial variations between annual (AADT) and summer (ASDT) traffic volumes are attributed to the fact that the road connects a number of summer resorts to Croatian motorway network.

Road junctions and populated areas

Maps

Sources

See also
 Highways in Croatia

D027
D027
D027